Fabriano Basket was an Italian professional basketball club based in Fabriano, Marche. 

Established in 1966, it played in the professional first and second divisions from 1979 to 2008, the side disappeared in June 2008 when it sold its right to play in the then LegaDue to Roseto after struggling to raise financing for the team.

Notable players 

2000s
  Luis Flores 1 season: '08
  Mike Gansey 1 season: '07-'08
  James Collins 1 season: '06-'07
  Willie Farley 1 season: '06-'07
  Brian Oliver 1 season: '05-'06
  Chris Thomas 1 season: '05-'06
  Tadas Klimavičius 1 season: '04-'05
  James Forrest 1 season: '04-'05
  Drew Nicholas 1 season: '03-'04
  Roberto Nunez 1 season: '02-'03
  DeeAndre Hulett 1 season: '02-'03
  Michael Meeks 1 season: '01-'02
  Tyrone Washington 1 season: '01-'02
  Gundars Vētra 2 seasons: '00-'02

1990s
  Rodney Monroe 3 seasons: '99-'02
  Dexter Cambridge 1 season: '98-'99
  Steve Bucknall 1 season: '98-'99
  Anthony Pelle 1 season: '98-'99
  Pace Mannion 2 seasons: '97-98, '99-'00
  Ryan Lorthridge 1 season: '97-'98
  Michael Young 1 season: '96-'97
  Eric Anderson 1 season: '96-'97
  Marcus Stokes 1 season: '95-'96
  John Turner 3 seasons: '93-'94, '97-'98, '02-'03
  Bob McAdoo 1 season: '92-'93
  Jay Murphy 4 seasons: '91-'95
  Larry Spriggs 2 seasons: '91-'93
  Carlton McKinney 1 season: '90-'91

1980s
  Marco Solfrini 3 seasons: '88-'91
  Israel Machado 5 seasons: '86-'91
  Marcel De Souza 4 seasons: '85-'89
  Alfredrick Hughes 1 season: '86-'87

Sponsorship names
Throughout the years, due to sponsorship, the club has been known as:

Honky Wear Fabriano (1979–80)
Honky Jeans Fabriano (1980–82)
Honky Fabriano (1982–84)
A.P. Fabriano (1985–86)
Alno Fabriano (1986–90)
Turboair Fabriano (1990–92)
Teamsystem Fabriano (1992–94)
Turboair Fabriano (1994–96) 
Faber Fabriano (1996–98)
Zara Fabriano (1998–99)
Fabriano Basket (1999-00)
Banca Marche Fabriano (2000–01)
Fabriano Basket (2001-02)
Carifac Fabriano (2002–03)
Carifabriano Fabriano (2004–06)

References

External links 
Serie A historical results  Retrieved 23 August 2015

1966 establishments in Italy
2008 disestablishments in Italy
Basketball teams established in 1966
Basketball teams in the Marche
Fabriano
Defunct basketball teams in Italy
Basketball teams disestablished in 2008